These are the team rosters of the 16 teams competing in the 2007 FIBA Asia Championship.

Group A

Head coach:  Adiljan Jun

Head coach:  Rajko Toroman





Group B









Group C









Group D









External links 
 2007 FIBA Asia Championship official website

Squad
2007